The National Conference of the African National Congress is a party congress that is held every five years. It elects members to the National Executive Committee, the party's highest decision-making body, as well as the "Top Six" leaders of the National Executive. The next national conference, the ANC's 55th, will be held in December 2022.

Timetables
Before the ANC was banned by the South African government in 1960, it held annual national congresses. After 1960, however, it held only sporadic consultative conferences abroad. In 1991, after it had been unbanned, the ANC held its first national conference in 32 years in Durban. Thereafter conferences were held every three years, until the 1997 conference in Mafikeng resolved to change the ANC constitution such that national conferences would be held only every five years.

List of venues
1949: 38th National Conference, held in Bloemfontein
 1953: 42nd National Conference, held in Queenstown
1954: 43rd National Conference, held in Durban
1955: 44th National Conference, held in Bloemfontein
 1957: 45th National Conference, held in Orlando
 1959: 47th National Conference, held in Durban
 1969: 1st Consultative Conference, held in Morogoro, Tanzania
 1985: 2nd Consultative Conference, held in Kabwe, Zambia
 1990: 3rd Consultative Conference, held in Johannesburg
1991: 48th National Conference, held in Durban
 1994: 49th National Conference, held in Bloemfontein
 1997: 50th National Conference, held in Mafikeng
 2002: 51st National Conference, held in Stellenbosch
 2007: 52nd National Conference, held in Polokwane
 2012: 53rd National Conference, held in Mangaung
 2017: 54th National Conference, held in Nasrec

See also 

 History of the African National Congress

References

External links
 Key documents from national conferences of the ANC
AP footage of the 48th National Conference